De'Andre Johnson (born February 2, 1996) is an American football quarterback for the New Jersey Generals of the United States Football League (USFL). He played college football at East Mississippi Community College, Florida Atlantic, and Texas Southern.

Early life and high school
Johnson grew up in Jacksonville, Florida and attended First Coast High School. As a senior, he completed 215 of 328 pass attempts for 3,710 yards and 47 touchdowns while rushing for 398 yards and nine touchdowns and was named the Class 8A Player of the Year and Florida's "Mr. Football". Johnson committed to play college football at Florida State during the summer before his sophomore year over offers from Clemson and Florida.

College career
Johnson began his collegiate career at Florida State and joined the team as an early enrollee. During the summer before his freshman season he was charged with misdemeanor battery for punching a  woman during an argument. Johnson was ultimately dismissed from the team on July 6, 2015.

Following his dismissal, Johnson enrolled at East Mississippi Community College. While at East Mississippi, he was featured in the  second season of the Netflix documentary series Last Chance U. In his only season with the Lions, Johnson passed for 2,646 yards and 26 touchdowns. He committed to transfer to Florida Atlantic to continue his college football career.

In his first season at FAU, Johnson completed 2 of 3 pass attempts for five yards with one interception and rushed four times for 31 yards in the team's season opener against Navy. Several hours after the game, he was hospitalized due to blood clots in his arm and missed the remainder of his redshirt sophomore season. After his redshirt junior season, Johnson announced that he would be transferring to Texas Southern as a graduate student. In his only season with the Tigers, he completed 132 of 215 pass attempts for 1,575 yards with nine touchdowns and three interceptions.

Professional career
Johnson went unselected in the 2020 NFL Draft. In 2021, he played in The Spring League for the Sea Lions and passed for 574 yards with 5 touchdowns and 7 interceptions over six games.

Johnson was selected in the 12th round of the 2022 USFL Draft by the New Jersey Generals. He was named the backup, behind Luis Perez. In the USFL opener, Johnson was used regularly in various offensive packages and rushed for a game-high 98 yards and one touchdown on 12 carries and completing 3 of 8 passes for 59 yards in a 24-28 loss to the Birmingham Stallions.

Statistics

References

External links
FAU Owls bio
Texas Southern Tigers bio

1996 births
Living people
Players of American football from Jacksonville, Florida
American football quarterbacks
Texas Southern Tigers football players
Florida Atlantic Owls football players
East Mississippi Lions football players
New Jersey Generals (2022) players
The Spring League players